Phlebiopsis is a genus of poroid crust fungi in the family Phanerochaetaceae. The genus contains 11 species, which collectively have a widespread distribution. The genome sequence of the type species, Phlebiopsis gigantea, was published in 2014.

Species
Phlebiopsis afibulata (G.Cunn.) Stalpers (1985) – New Zealand
Phlebiopsis bicornis Douanla-Meli (2009) – Cameroon
Phlebiopsis crassa (Lév.) D.Floudas & Hibbett (2015)
Phlebiopsis darjeelingensis Dhingra (1987) – Himalayas
Phlebiopsis erubescens Hjortstam & Ryvarden (2005)
Phlebiopsis flavidoalba (Cooke) Hjortstam (1987)
Phlebiopsis galochroa (Bres.) Hjortstam & Ryvarden (1980)
Phlebiopsis gigantea (Fr.) Jülich (1978)
Phlebiopsis himalayensis Dhingra (1987) – Himalayas
Phlebiopsis lamprocystidiata (Sheng H.Wu) Sheng H.Wu & Hallenb. (2010)
Phlebiopsis mussooriensis Priyanka, Dhingra & N.Kaur (2011) – India
Phlebiopsis ravenelii (Cooke) Hjortstam (1987)

References

Phanerochaetaceae
Polyporales genera
Fungi described in 1978
Taxa named by Walter Jülich